Ekkapob Sanitwong is a Thai footballer who plays as a  left-back.

References

External links

Living people
1984 births
Ekkapob Sanitwong
Ekkapob Sanitwong
Ekkapob Sanitwong
Ekkapob Sanitwong
Association football defenders